The 2003 Winter Deaflympics officially known as the 15th Winter Deaflympics is an international multi-sport event that was held from 28 February 2003 to 8 March 2003.The  event was hosted by Sundsvall, Sweden.

Curling competitions were also introduced for the first time in this Winter Deaflympics.

The logo for the 15th Winter Deaflympics symbolises the fire from the torch.

References 

 
2003 Winter
2003 in Swedish sport
International sports competitions hosted by Sweden